I Wanna Play House is a 1936 Warner Bros. Merrie Melodies cartoon directed by Friz Freleng. The short was released on January 11, 1936.

Plot
Two bear cubs, one brown and one black, sneak away from Papa Bear to enjoy a game of hide-and-seek. The black cub goes into a Gypsy trailer and gets drunk on cider. The little bears' harmless hijinks soon turn into danger on the runaway wagon.

See also
Looney Tunes and Merrie Melodies filmography

Notes
This short was scored by Bernard Brown and animated by Cal Dalton and Sandy Walker. 
This cartoon is notable to be the first Warner Bros. cartoon with "target" titles which would mainly be used in the Merrie Melodies, and later Looney Tunes, cartoons until 1964.

References

1936 films
1936 animated films
Films scored by Bernard B. Brown
Films scored by Norman Spencer (composer)
Short films directed by Friz Freleng
Merrie Melodies short films
Warner Bros. Cartoons animated short films
Animated films about bears
1930s Warner Bros. animated short films